Viktor Platan (16 October 1919 — 12 January 2013) was a Finnish pentathlete. He competed at the 1948 Summer Olympics in London, where he finished 10th in a field of 45 participants in the individual event. He also finished 13th among 14 athletes in the winter pentathlon demonstration event at the 1948 Winter Olympics, after failing to complete the program. He then competed at the 1949, 1950, and 1951 World Modern Pentathlon Championships, winning silver medals with the Finnish team in each and an individual bronze medal in 1949. He was born in Lappeenranta.

References

1919 births
2013 deaths
Finnish male modern pentathletes
Modern pentathletes at the 1948 Summer Olympics
Olympic modern pentathletes of Finland
People from Lappeenranta
World Modern Pentathlon Championships medalists
Sportspeople from South Karelia